Joshua Bertie (born 9 October 1996) is a semi-professional footballer who plays as a full-back or forward for Winchester City.

Club career
Bertie made his competitive debut for Andover Town on 4 August 2018 in a 10–1 defeat to AFC Stoneham, playing all ninety minutes of the match. He scored his first competitive goal for the club as part of a brace just a week later, in the 28th minute of a 5–2 defeat to United Services Portsmouth in the FA Cup. After a change of position from full-back to forward, Bertie scored 31 goals in 26 matches for Andover Town in the 2021–22 season, earning him a move to Southern League Premier Division South side Dorchester Town. In June 2022, he joined fellow Southern Premier Division side Winchester City. In November 2022, he played a match on loan at Bemerton Heath Harlequins.

International career
Bertie made his senior international debut on 25 July 2018 in a 3–2 victory over Sint Maarten.

Career statistics

Club

International

References

External links
 
 Joshua Bertie at the Cowley Community College
 2015 Statistics at the Kansas Jayhawk Community College Conference official website
 2016 Statistics at the Kansas Jayhawk Community College Conference official website
 Wessex League stats
 Non-league stats at Aylesbury United

Living people
1996 births
British Virgin Islands footballers
British Virgin Islands international footballers
Association football defenders
Andover Town F.C. players
People of British Virgin Islands descent
Cowley Tigers men's soccer players
Lander Bearcats men's soccer players
Footballers from Greater London
English footballers
English expatriate footballers
English expatriate sportspeople in the United States
Dorchester Town F.C. players
Winchester City F.C. players
Bemerton Heath Harlequins F.C. players
Southern Football League players
Wessex Football League players